Origmatogonidae is a family of millipedes belonging to the order Chordeumatida. This family has been folded into the family Chamaesomatidae.

Genera:
 Alavasoma Mauriès & Vicente, 1977
 Origmatogona Ribaut, 1913
 Vascosoma Mauriès, 1966

References

Chordeumatida
Millipede families